The Sydney Football Stadium, commercially known as Allianz Stadium and previously Aussie Stadium, was a football stadium in Moore Park, Sydney, Australia. Built in 1988 next to the Sydney Cricket Ground, the stadium was Sydney's premier rectangular field venue for rugby league, rugby union, and soccer.

Australia's respected national Football teams, the Kangaroos, the Wallabies, and the Socceroos occasionally played at the stadium, while the Eastern Suburbs/Sydney City/Sydney Roosters, NSW Waratahs, and Sydney FC were the ground's major tenants. The stadium usually held both National Rugby League semi finals and one preliminary final, and also held the annual pre-season Charity Shield football match between South Sydney and St George Illawarra for a number of years. It hosted all New South Wales Rugby League/Australian Rugby League rugby league grand finals, as well as the first grand final under the NRL banner, between 1988 and 1998.

The NSW Government announced plans in November 2017 for the stadium to be demolished and rebuilt. The stadium closed in October 2018, with the last event being a Michael Bublé concert. Demolition began in early 2019, continuing after several legal challenges and becoming a major issue during the 2019 state election. It was ultimately replaced by the Sydney Football Stadium (2022) opening on 28 August 2022.

History

Background

Prior to its construction, major events were usually held at the Sydney Cricket Ground (SCG), as it was the largest stadium in Sydney. Although it was used many times for such events, the SCG's oval shape meant it was not ideal for sports like soccer, rugby league and rugby union that require a rectangular field.

Sydney Football Stadium was built upon the former Sydney Sports Ground in Moore Park, and the former SCG No 2 adjacent to the existing SCG. Both were owned by the Sydney Cricket Ground Trust. It was built by Civil & Civic and officially opened by Premier Barrie Unsworth on 24 January 1988. The first sporting event was a rugby league match between the Eastern Suburbs Roosters and St George Dragons on 4 March 1988.

Its seating capacity was 41,159, but after numerous expansions, finally stood at 45,500 , although the record attendance for a sporting event was 44,380 , set on 22 September 2018 for the 2018 NRL Finals Series match between the Sydney Roosters and South Sydney Rabbitohs.

Use

The Sydney Football Stadium was the Sydney Roosters' home ground from 1988. It was built on the site of the old Sydney Sports Ground which served as the Roosters home ground for decades, and the old SCG No 2 which served as a secondary ground for some state cricket matches, an additional training ground, and athletics. Both grounds were demolished in 1986 to make way for the SFS.

The first event held at the venue marked the beginning of the 1988 rugby league season, with a match between the then Eastern Suburbs Roosters and the St George Dragons on Friday 4 March 1988. St George won the game 24–14. The Roosters had to wait until Round 5 that season for their first win at the venue, defeating the Gold Coast Giants 28–10.

From 1988 to 1999 and from 2002 to 2005, it also served as the home ground for the South Sydney Rabbitohs. The Rabbitohs returned to the ground with a one-off game against the Broncos in Round 25 of the 2015 NRL season.

The SFS has hosted rugby league football test matches since its opening in 1988 starting with two matches in Australia's 1988 Ashes series win against Great Britain. The first game of the series saw the Wally Lewis captained, Don Furner coached Australians christen their new Sydney home with a 17–6 win in front of 24,480 fans. That game was also the 100th test match between Australia and either Great Britain or England. The record international Rugby League crowd at the stadium was set for the first Ashes against Great Britain on their 1992 Australasian Tour when Australia won 22–6 in front of 40,141 in what was the first time a test in Sydney had attracted over 40,000 fans since 1974. The stadium has also hosted the Rugby League Tri-Nations, including the Final of the 2006 tournament in which Australia triumphed 16–12 over New Zealand in Golden point extra-time thanks to a try by captain Darren Lockyer.

Rugby league also had some memorable moments including: The first grand final in 1988 saw Canterbury-Bankstown defeat Balmain 24–12 in front of 40,000 fans to send club captain Steve Mortimer into retirement with a premiership. The match had its controversial moment when Bulldogs  Terry Lamb hit Tigers English import  Ellery Hanley with a high tackle out of the game before the 30th minute: The 1989 NSWRL grand final which was won by the Canberra Raiders over the Balmain Tigers 19-14 thanks to a try by replacement forward Steve Jackson in extra-time for their first premiership: The 1991 NSWRL grand final won by the Penrith Panthers over Canberra 19–12 in which Penrith's Royce Simmons scored 2 tries in his final match giving the Panthers their first title: Brisbane's maiden premiership with a 28–8 win over St. George in 1992 NSWRL grand final, highlighted by a 95-metre try to Broncos  Steve Renouf: and the 1997 ARL Grand Final between the Newcastle Knights and the Manly-Warringah Sea Eagles, with the Knights winning their first title with a 22–16 win following a try to Darren Albert in the dying seconds of the game after the Knights had trailed Manly since early in the game. Manly had won their previous 11 games against the Knights prior to that Grand Final.

The last grand final played at the SFS was the 1998 NRL Grand Final between Canterbury and Brisbane. In front of 40,857 fans, the Broncos ran out easy 38-12 winners to win their fourth premiership from four grand Final appearances.

Two standout State Of Origin matches in which Queensland triumphed over New South Wales with last-minute victories in 1994 and 1998, as well as Michael O'Connor's sideline conversion in driving rain for a NSW win in Game 2 of the 1991 series. Also of note was Queensland's backs to the wall win in Game 2 of the 1989. Despite losing Allan Langer to a broken leg, Mal Meninga with a fractured eye socket and Paul Vautin with an elbow injury in the first half, plus losing winger Michael Hancock to a shoulder injury in the second half, the Maroons triumphed 16–12 to wrap up the series. It was also found out after the game that Queensland's lock forward Bob Lindner had played most of the second half with a fractured ankle.

The Sydney Football Stadium has been the venue of some of Australian sport's greatest matches and moments. The final of the 1993 World Youth Cup between Brazil and Ghana was also held at the SFS, Brazil winning 2–1. The 1994 FIFA World Cup qualifier between Australia and Argentina featuring Argentine association football legend Diego Maradona, finishing in a 1–1 draw with goals to Aurelio Vidmar for Australia and Abel Balbo for Argentina. Despite the grounds increase in capacity since 1993, this match retains the record sporting attendance at the SFS and many more were actually in attendance as the gates were thrown open close to kick-off as a safety measure.

It was used as the venue for the 2000 Summer Olympics Women's association football gold medal match between Norway and the United States. Norway defeated the USA 3–2 in front of 22,848 fans.

In 2002, the naming rights were purchased by Aussie Home Loans in a 5-year + 5-year deal. Due to this, the stadium was renamed Aussie Stadium. On 7 July 2007 the stadium reverted to its original Sydney Football Stadium name after Aussie Home Loans and the SCG Trust mutually elected not to extend the naming rights deal.

In 2003, the SFS hosted several matches in the Rugby World Cup: (Ireland v Namibia), (Argentina v Romania), (Scotland v Fiji), (South Africa v Georgia), (Georgia v Uruguay; this match was notable for attracting a crowd of 28,576, despite the low profiles of both teams).

In 2007 the Sydney Roosters High Performance Centre and Administrative departments set up their headquarters at the Sydney Football Stadium.

The 2008 Rugby League World Cup's opening ceremony  and Group A match between Australia and New Zealand was played at the Stadium. The SFS also hosted one game from the knockout stage: the second semi-final between Australia and Fiji.

In 2012, Allianz Insurance secured the rights to the naming of the Sydney Football Stadium; the venue is now known as Allianz Stadium.

In 2018, Allianz Stadium hosted one of three AFL pre-season mini competitions called AFLX.

Development

In 2012 Sydney Cricket Ground Trust announced a master plan to redevelop Sydney Football Stadium, as well as Sydney Cricket Ground and the surrounding area, with a vision "for the SCG and Allianz Stadium is to create an exciting new concept for Sydney’s central sporting precinct - a revitalised, world-class, sports and recreation facility for NSW and Australia". The development of Sydney Football Stadium would have included a new fully covered roof and a new LED facade mesh for the stadium which would allow the exterior to change colours to suit the home team, similar to Munich's Allianz Arena. As well, development to the surrounding area would have included a new public plaza between the Sydney Cricket Ground and Sydney Football Stadium, new transport infrastructure, new underground car parks (4,100 cars) and development of the surrounding parkland. The scheduled start date for the project would have commenced after the completion of the Sydney Cricket Ground redevelopment, in January 2014. In early 2015, the video screens were replaced with large High Definition screens similar to the one at the Dally Messenger Stand at the SCG.

In September 2015, the New South Wales Government announced a proposal to replace the SFS with a new 50,000 to 55,000 seat venue. The proposed new stadium was cancelled in April 2016, with the SFS to be refurbished instead.

On 8 March 2019, the NSW government announced that the stadium would be demolished

Rebuilding

In 2017 the NSW Government announced that the Sydney Football Stadium along with Stadium Australia will be demolished and rebuilt at the cost of $2.3 billion. The final event at the stadium was a Michael Bublé concert on 5 October 2018. Demolition began in early 2019.
In December 2019, the NSW Government awarded the construction contract for the new Sydney Football Stadium to the John Holland Group, with a planned completion date in time for the September 2022 NRL Grand Final.

Sporting events

1988: The stadium hosted the 100th rugby league test match between Australia and Great Britain/England. 
1993: Argentinian player Diego Maradona played here in the World Cup qualifier against Australia, in which the match was drawn 1–1.
1994: Rugby union provided a moment of magic thanks to George Gregan's last second match-winning tackle on NZ's Jeff Wilson in which Australia regained the Bledisloe Cup.
19 December 1997: representatives of clubs affiliated with the Australian Rugby League gathered at the SFS to decide whether to accept News Limited's offer of a settlement with the breakaway 'Super League' - eventually voting in favour by 36 votes to 4.
 27 September 1998: The SFS hosted the inaugural NRL Grand Final between the Brisbane Broncos and Canterbury Bulldogs. It was to be the last rugby league Grand Final the stadium would host, with grand finals moving to the then 110,000 seat Stadium Australia from 1999.
 2 November 2002: The Stadium hosted both Opening and Closing Ceremonies of the 2002 Gay Games.
 17 May 2006: the stadium hosted the boxing fight between Danny Green and Anthony Mundine.
 5 March 2006: the inaugural A-League Grand Final was held here. Sydney FC defeated the Central Coast Mariners 1–0 in front of 41,689.
 25 November 2006: the stadium hosted the 2006 Rugby League Tri-Nations Final.
2010: Qualifying Final between the Sydney Roosters and Wests Tigers, where Roosters player Braith Anasta kicked a field goal off the scrum to send the game to golden point, then Roosters player Shaun Kenny-Dowall intercepted a ball and scored in extra time.
 29 February 2012: Insurer Allianz announces a multi-year partnership with the SCG Trust to see the stadium officially renamed Allianz Stadium.
21 April 2013: 2013 A-League Grand Final between Central Coast Mariners and Western Sydney Wanderers.
26 August 2017: 2017 NCAA DI FBS American college football season opening match, between the Owls of Rice University and the Cardinal of Stanford University.
7 May 2017: 2017 A-League Grand Final between Sydney FC and Melbourne Victory.
 4 November 2017: RLWC 2017 pool stage match between England and Lebanon
 11 November 2017: RLWC 2017 pool stage match between Australia and Lebanon
 21 November 2017: 2017 FFA Cup Final between Sydney FC and Adelaide United where Sydney were winners 2–1. Attendance 13,452.
 17 February 2018: 2018 AFLX competition consisting of 6 teams (Greater Western Sydney, Richmond, Brisbane Lions, Sydney, Western Bulldogs and Gold Coast)
 22 September 2018: The last sporting event at the Sydney Football Stadium prior to demolition, an NRL preliminary final between the Sydney Roosters and the South Sydney Rabbitohs, took place with the Roosters running out 12–4 winners in front of a stadium record crowd of 44,380.

Concerts
26 & 27 November 1993: U2 performed during their Zoo TV Tour. The show on the 27th was recorded and released as the concert film, Zoo TV: Live from Sydney.
27 February 1998: U2 - Popmart Tour.
9 & 10 March 2000: Barbra Streisand - Timeless Tour.
 7 July 2007: Australian concert of Live Earth.
 22 November 2009: Pearl Jam concert, as listed on their page for the Backspacer Tour.
 26 February 2010: George Michael performed his first concert in Sydney since 1988.
 17 18 & 19 December 2010: Bon Jovi - The Circle Tour.
2 & 4 December 2011: Eminem - Recovery Tour.
8 December 2011: Band Foo Fighters - Wasting Light World Tour.
17 & 18 November 2012: Coldplay - Mylo Xyloto Tour.
4 December 2013: Taylor Swift - Red Tour
7 & 8 February 2015: One Direction - On The Road Again Tour.
9 December 2015: Ed Sheeran - X Tour 
13 & 14 December 2016: Coldplay - A Head Full of Dreams Tour.
2 December 2017: Sia - Nostalgic for the Present Tour.
5 October 2018: Michael Bublé concert, final event before the stadium closed.

Other events
 2005: the Edinburgh Military Tattoo - A Salute to Australia.
 February 2007: the stadium was recently under renovation, during which the capacity was expanded to 45,500, and a second video screen was added. Renovations were completed.
 24 February 2008: the SFS hosted the 2008 A-League Grand Final between Newcastle and the Central Coast Mariners.
March 2015: The two video screens were replaced with much larger screens.

Attendance records

Grand finals
Since its opening in 1988, the Sydney Football Stadium hosted eleven NSWRL/ARL/NRL grand finals between 1988 and 1998, and has also hosted three A-League grand finals.

Rugby league

* Canterbury-Bankstown Bulldogs and Canberra Raiders hold the record for the most grand Final appearances at the stadium with four each. The Bulldogs appeared as Canterbury-Bankstown in 1988 and 1994, as the Sydney Bulldogs in 1995 and as the Canterbury Bulldogs in 1998* Canberra and the Brisbane Broncos hold the record for most grand final wins at the stadium with three each.* Brisbane and the Newcastle Knights are the only teams to win each of their grand finals played at the stadium.* St George and Balmain are the only clubs who failed to win in any of their grand Final appearances at the stadium.* Canterbury-Bankstown appeared in the first and last grand finals at the SFS.* Brisbane's 26 point win over Canterbury-Bankstown in 1998 is the biggest grand final winning margin at the SFS. Canberra's 4 point win over Penrith in 1990 is the smallest winning margin.

A-League
Since the A-League's first season in 2006, the Sydney Football Stadium has hosted the A-League grand final on four occasions, including the inaugural grand final between Sydney FC and the Central Coast Mariners.

Rugby league test matches
The Football Stadium has hosted twelve Australia internationals and one involving the Australian Super League. The results were as follows;

* 1997 Anzac Test match played against the Australian Super League team. The Australian Rugby League and Australian Rugby League Commission do not count this as an official test, though it is counted by the New Zealand Rugby League and the Rugby League International Federation.

Rugby union test matches
Since its opening in 1988, the Football Stadium has hosted twenty seven Australia rugby union internationals. The results were as follows;

Rugby World Cup
The SFS also hosted five 2003 Rugby World Cup matches but none of them involved Australia. The results were as follows;

International soccer
List of international soccer matches played at the Sydney Football Stadium since 1988 (Senior men's games only).

2000 Olympic Games
The Football Stadium hosted five games of the 2000 Olympic Games Men's Football tournament including a quarter final, a semi-final and the bronze medal match. It also hosted five matches of the Women's Football tournament including a Semi-final and the bronze and gold medal matches.

Men's tournament

Women's tournament

See also
Stadium Australia, another multi purpose stadium in Sydney

State of Origin
From 1988 to 1998, the Sydney Football Stadium was the home of the New South Wales rugby league team in the State of Origin series.

Statues
 Trevor Allan (rugby union and rugby league)
 Ken Catchpole (rugby union)
 Reg Gasnier (rugby league)
 Dally Messenger (rugby league)
 Johnny Warren (soccer)
 Betty Cuthbert (sprint)
 Marlene Mathews (sprint)

Transport
Sydney Football Stadium could be accessed by car, public transport and by walking.  The nearest railway station was Central station, three kilometres away. On event days, express shuttle buses ran every five minutes from Chalmers Street at Central station to Moore Park. The buses utilised a bus road off Anzac Parade to improve travel times. In 2015, the Albert Cotter Bridge opened across Anzac Parade opened to improve the pedestrian links between the stadium and Central station and Surry Hills.

References

External links

 Allianz Stadium
 Sydney Cricket & Sports Ground Trust
 Austadiums - Allianz Stadium

A-League Men stadiums
American football venues in Australia
Boxing venues in Australia
Multi-purpose stadiums in Australia
New South Wales rugby league team
New South Wales Waratahs
Olympic football venues
Paddington, New South Wales
Philip Cox buildings
Rugby League World Cup stadiums
Rugby World Cup stadiums
South Sydney Rabbitohs
Sports venues completed in 1988
Sports venues demolished in 2019
Sports venues in Sydney
Sydney FC
Sydney FC (A-League Women)
Sydney Roosters
Venues of the 2000 Summer Olympics
Wests Tigers
A-League Women stadiums
1988 establishments in Australia
2018 disestablishments in Australia
Moore Park, New South Wales
Defunct Australian rules football grounds
Defunct rugby league venues in Australia
Defunct rugby union stadiums in Australia
Defunct soccer venues in Australia
Demolished buildings and structures in Sydney
World Rugby Sevens Series venues
Demolished sports venues